Cordy Tindell Vivian (July 30, 1924July 17, 2020) was an American minister, author, and close friend and lieutenant of Martin Luther King Jr. during the civil rights movement. Vivian resided in Atlanta, Georgia, and founded the C. T. Vivian Leadership Institute, Inc. He was a member of the Alpha Phi Alpha fraternity.

Senator Barack Obama, speaking at Selma's Brown Chapel on the March 2007, anniversary of the 1965 Selma to Montgomery marches, referred to Vivian in his opening remarks in the words of Martin L. King Jr. as "the greatest preacher to ever live."

Early life
Vivian was born in Boonville, Missouri. As a small boy he migrated with his mother to Macomb, Illinois, where he attended Lincoln Grade School and Edison Junior High School. Vivian graduated from Macomb High School in 1942 and attended Western Illinois University in Macomb, where he worked as the sports editor for the school newspaper. His first professional job was recreation director for the Carver Community Center in Peoria, Illinois. There, Vivian participated in his first sit-in demonstrations, which successfully integrated Barton's Cafeteria in 1947.

Career
Studying for the ministry at American Baptist Theological Seminary (now called American Baptist College) in Nashville, Tennessee, in 1959, Vivian met James Lawson, who was teaching Mohandas Gandhi's nonviolent direct action strategy to the Nashville Student Movement. Soon Lawson's students, including Diane Nash, Bernard Lafayette, James Bevel, John Lewis and others from American Baptist, Fisk University and Tennessee State University, organized a systematic nonviolent sit-in campaign at local lunch counters. On April 19, 1960, 4,000 demonstrators peacefully walked to Nashville's City Hall, where Vivian and Diane Nash discussed the situation with Nashville Mayor Ben West. As a result, Mayor West publicly agreed that racial discrimination was morally wrong. Many of the students who participated in the Nashville Student Movement soon took on major leadership roles in both the Student Nonviolent Coordinating Committee (SNCC) and the Southern Christian Leadership Conference (SCLC).

Vivian helped found the Nashville Christian Leadership Conference, and helped organize the first sit-ins in Nashville in 1960 and the first civil rights march in 1961. In 1961, Vivian participated in Freedom Rides. He worked alongside Martin Luther King Jr. as the national director of affiliates for the SCLC. In this position, he was a vocal supporter of the strikers during the 1964–1965 Scripto strike in Atlanta. During the summer following the Selma Voting Rights Movement, Vivian conceived and directed an educational program, Vision, and put 702 Alabama students in college with scholarships (this program later became Upward Bound).

His 1970 Black Power and the American Myth was the first book on the Civil Rights Movement by a member of Martin Luther King's staff. In the 1970s Vivian moved to Atlanta, and in 1977 founded the Black Action Strategies and Information Center (BASIC), a consultancy on multiculturalism and race relations in the workplace and other contexts. In 1979 he co-founded, with Anne Braden, the Center for Democratic Renewal (initially as the National Anti-Klan Network), an organization where blacks and whites worked together in response to white supremacist activity. In 1984 he served in Jesse Jackson's presidential campaign, as the national deputy director for clergy. In 1994 he helped to establish, and served on the board of Capitol City Bank and Trust Co., a black-owned Atlanta bank. He also served on the board of Every Church a Peace Church.

Vivian continued to speak publicly and offer workshops, and did so at many conferences around the country and the world, including with the United Nations. He was featured as an activist and an analyst in the civil rights documentary Eyes on the Prize, and was featured in a PBS special, The Healing Ministry of Dr. C. T. Vivian. He  made numerous appearances on Oprah as well as the Montel Williams Show and Donahue. He was the focus of the biography Challenge and Change: The Story of Civil Rights Activist C.T. Vivian by Lydia Walker.

In 2008, Vivian founded and incorporated the C. T. Vivian Leadership Institute, Inc. (CTVLI) to "Create a Model Leadership Culture in Atlanta" Georgia.  The C. T. Vivian Leadership Institute conceived, developed and implemented the "Yes, We Care" campaign on December 18, 2008 (four days after the City of Atlanta turned the water off at Morris Brown College (MBC)) and, over a period of two and a half months, mobilized the Atlanta community to donate in excess of $500,000 directly to Morris Brown as "bridge funding." That effort saved the Historically Black College or University (HBCU) and allowed the college to negotiate with the city which ultimately restored the water services to the college.

In 2018, Vivian donated his collection of 6,000 volumes of books largely about the black experience and written by black authors to the National Monuments Foundation for inclusion in the Peace Column, the centerpiece of the upcoming Rodney Cook Sr. Park in Vine City. The C.T. Vivian Library will be housed within the base of the 110-foot column.

Later life

On August 8, 2013, President Barack Obama named Vivian as a recipient of the Presidential Medal of Freedom. The citation in the press release reads as follows:

Vivian died from natural causes in Atlanta on July 17, 2020, thirteen days before his 96th birthday, and on the same day when his friend and fellow activist, John Lewis, died in the same city. He was the first Black, non-elected man to lie in state at the Georgia State Capitol. He was buried at Westview Cemetery in Atlanta.

Works 

 Black Power and the American Myth (1970)

See also
 List of civil rights leaders
 James Parks Morton Interfaith Award

References

Further reading

 Pam Adams, The Legacy Project, Peoria Journal Star, October 24, 1999 – an interview, two articles, and a timeline of his life.
 C. T. Vivian, The Transformation of America Project. Includes five-minute video interview with Vivian.

External links

C.T. Vivian's oral history video excerpts at The National Visionary Leadership Project

Stuart A. Rose Manuscript, Archives, and Rare Book Library, Emory University: C.T. and Octavia Vivian papers, circa 1923–2013
C.T. and Octavia Vivian papers

1924 births
2020 deaths
People from Boonville, Missouri
People from Macomb, Illinois
Western Illinois University alumni
African-American writers
Writers from Atlanta
Writers from Illinois
Writers from Missouri
Activists for African-American civil rights
American conscientious objectors
American Methodists
Nonviolence advocates
Baptist ministers from the United States
Christian writers
Freedom Riders
American humanitarians
American Christian pacifists
African-American activists
Presidential Medal of Freedom recipients
Selma to Montgomery marches
People from Peoria, Illinois
Nashville Student Movement
21st-century African-American people